Michiel de Ruyter is a 2015 Dutch film about the 17th-century admiral Michiel de Ruyter directed by Roel Reiné. The film had its world premiere in the Nederlands Scheepvaartmuseum in Amsterdam on 26 January 2015 and has been released in cinemas in the Netherlands on 29 January 2015. On the English promotional website, the film has the title Admiral.

Cast 

The first choice for the title role was Yorick van Wageningen, but he could not come to a financial agreement with the producers. On 9 May 2014, the full cast was presented to the press.
 Frank Lammers as Michiel de Ruyter
 Barry Atsma as Johan de Witt
 Egbert-Jan Weber as William III
 Gene Bervoets as Van Ginneken
 Jada Borsato as Neeltje de Ruyter
 Will Bowden as Prince Rupert of the Rhine
 Daniel Brocklebank
 Hajo Bruins as Cornelis Tromp
 Jules Croiset
 Charles Dance as Charles II
 Lukas Dijkema
 Roeland Fernhout as Cornelis de Witt
 Tygo Gernandt as Joseph van Ghent
 Rutger Hauer as Maarten Tromp
 Jelle de Jong
 Joost Koning
 Youval Kuipers
 Isa Lammers
 Sanne Langelaar as Anna de Ruyter
 Lieke van Lexmond as Wendela de Witt
 Derek de Lint as Johan Kievit
 Victor Löw as De Waerd
 Aurélie Meriel
 Filip Peeters as Abraham Duquesne
 Pip Pellens
 Bas van Prooijen
 Nils Verkooijen
 Viv Weatherall

Production 

The film was directed by Roel Reiné and produced by Klaas de Jong. It had a budget of 8 million euro. Among the film locations are Zeeland, Texel, the Wadden Sea, and the Ridderzaal.

Reception

Pre-release
Prior to its release, several protest groups had accused the film of glorifying the colonial history of the Netherlands although references to colonialism in the film are almost absent. The film makes a minor reference to the Dutch East India Company, which contributed highly to the welfare in the 17th century in the Low Countries, and to the trading vessels that were protected by the navy under Michiel de Ruyter. The film's main subjects, apart from Ruyter himself, are the internal politics of the country, including the brutal murder of Johan de Witt and the complicated relationship with England, up to the engagement of the William III of Orange with the English princess Mary.

Post-release
On Rotten Tomatoes, the film has an approval rating of 67% based on six reviews, with an average rating of 6.6/10. In a review for the Los Angeles Times, Robert Abele writes: "With loving shots of booming, towering ships so dominant, and decades squeezed into what feels like a week of action, there's barely enough time to develop De Ruyter as a character in his own movie, or even successfully explain his war strategies."

Awards 
 Golden Film for 100,000 visitors
 Platinum Film for 400,000 visitors

See also 
 Anglo-Dutch Wars
 Franco-Dutch War
 Four Days' Battle

References

External links 

 
 
 

2015 biographical drama films
2010s historical drama films
2015 war drama films
2015 films
2010s Dutch-language films
Dutch biographical drama films
Dutch war drama films
Dutch historical drama films
Films set in the 1660s
Films set in the 1670s
Films set in Amsterdam
Films set in London
Seafaring films based on actual events
Films about naval warfare
Cultural depictions of Dutch men
Cultural depictions of admirals
Cultural depictions of William III of England
Films set in the Dutch Golden Age
Cultural depictions of Charles II of England